Jade Ashtyn Carey (born May 27, 2000) is an American artistic gymnast who represented the United States at the 2020 Summer Olympics in Tokyo. Best known for her abilities on vault and floor exercise, she is the 2020 Olympic champion on floor exercise, a two-time World medalist (2017 silver, 2022 bronze), the 2018 Pan American Champion, and a four-time American national silver medalist (2017-2019, 2022). On vault, she is the 2022 World champion, a two-time World silver medalist (2017, 2019), the 2018 Pan American champion, and a two-time American national champion (2017, 2022). She was a member of the teams that won gold at the 2019 World Championships, the 2022 World Championships, and the 2018 Pan American Champion. With a total of eight Olympic and World Championship medals, Carey is the sixth most decorated U.S. female gymnast of all time.

Gymnastics career

Level 10
In 2016, Carey competed at the Junior Olympics Nationals where she successfully completed a tucked Kasamatsu full on vault, after which it was named The Carey in the J.O. code of points.  Carey was invited to her first elite level national team camp in late 2016.

Senior elite

2017
Carey began 2017 as a Level 10 gymnast, which is below elite level in USA Gymnastics. She was invited to The Ranch by national team coordinator Valeri Liukin throughout the start of the year where she qualified for elite status.

Carey made her elite debut at the American Classic at Karolyi Ranch on July 7, 2017. She only competed on vault, floor, and balance beam but placed first on each of those events.  Later that month, she competed at the 2017 U.S. Classic and once again only competed on vault, floor, and balance beam. She placed first on vault, where she competed an Amanar and a double-twisting Tsukahara, first on floor, including both a full-twisting double layout (Chusovitina) and double-twisting double tuck (Silivas) in her routine, and fourth on balance beam. In August, Carey participated in the 2017 U.S. National Gymnastics Championships where she won gold on vault and silver on floor exercise, behind Ragan Smith. She was named to the national team for the first time.

In September, Carey was selected to represent the United States at the 2017 World Artistic Gymnastics Championships in Montreal alongside Ragan Smith, Morgan Hurd, and Ashton Locklear. On the first day of competition, Carey competed only on floor and vault. With clean performances on both, she qualified third for the floor exercise final (14.100), behind Smith and Mai Murakami of Japan, and second for the vault final, behind reigning world champion Maria Paseka of Russia.

During event finals, Carey won the silver medal on both vault and floor exercise, once again finishing behind Paseka and Murakami respectively.

2018
Carey competed at the American Classic in early July in Salt Lake City, Utah. She competed her first elite uneven bars routine in addition to her routine on balance beam and placed 10th on each apparatus. On July 28, Carey made her elite all-around debut at the 2018 U.S. Classic. She placed first on vault, where she debuted a Lopez as her new second vault, and second on floor behind Simone Biles, where she debuted a Moors (double-twisting double layout) as her opening pass. However, she only placed 10th all-around due to a fall on uneven bars and a major error on her beam dismount.

In August, Carey competed at the National Championships where she placed sixth in the all-around, earning an automatic national team spot. She also finished third on vault behind Biles and Jordan Chiles, second on floor exercise behind Biles, 15th on uneven bars, and 9th on balance beam. On August 20 Carey was named to the team to compete at the Pan American Championships alongside Grace McCallum, Trinity Thomas, Kara Eaker, and Shilese Jones. There she won gold in the team finals and on vault and floor exercise.

In October, the nominative team roster for the 2018 World Championships in Doha, Qatar was posted. Carey was noticeably absent despite her strong performances at the previous two competitions. USAG later revealed that Carey had declined her invitation to the Worlds qualification camp and was going to pursue qualifying for the 2020 Olympics "as an individual through the apparatus World Cup series, which precludes her competing on the 2018 World Team". As the American team later won the gold medal at the championships and thus qualified to the Olympics, she would have been ineligible to qualify a nominative spot on the World Cup series had she competed in Doha.

In November, USAG announced that Carey would be competing at the Cottbus World Cup.  She qualified second to the vault final behind Rebeca Andrade of Brazil and first to the floor exercise final.  During event finals Carey won silver on vault, once again behind Andrade, and fifth on floor exercise after stepping out of bounds three times.

2019
In February, USA Gymnastics announced that Carey would compete at the Baku and Doha World Cups in March.  In Baku, Carey qualified in first place to the vault final after upgrading her López (start value 5.2) to a Cheng (start value 6.0) and qualified second to the floor exercise final behind Lara Mori of Italy after going out of bounds and performing a watered down routine.  She received the AGF Trophy for having the highest combined execution score in the qualification round.  Carey won the gold medal in the vault final and was the only gymnast to earn execution scores above nine on both of her vaults.  The following day, she competed in the floor exercise final with higher difficulty and won the gold medal ahead of Mori and three-time Olympian Vanessa Ferrari.  At the Doha World Cup, Carey qualified to the vault final in second place behind Maria Paseka and first to the floor exercise final, 0.8 points ahead of second place Marine Boyer of France and Kim Bui of Germany.  In the vault final, Carey won the gold medal, defeating Paseka by 0.117 points. Once again she was the only competitor to earn an execution score above 9 on both of her vaults. In the floor exercise final, Carey once again won the gold medal ahead of Mori and Ferrari, defeating them by more than one point.

At the 2019 GK US Classic in July, Carey placed tenth in the all-around. She won the gold medal on vault ahead of Aleah Finnegan and Shilese Jones and she tied with Grace McCallum for the silver medal on floor exercise behind Simone Biles. She placed fifteenth on uneven bars and tied for seventeenth on balance beam with Alexis Jeffrey.

At the 2019 U.S. National Championships Carey competed on all four events and ended the first day of competition in third in the all-around behind Biles and Sunisa Lee. On the second day of competition she fell off the uneven bars and finished seventh in the all-around but won silver on vault and floor exercise, finishing behind Biles on both.  As a result she was added to the national team for the third time.

In September Carey competed at the US World Championships trials where she placed fifth in the all-around behind Simone Biles, Sunisa Lee, Kara Eaker, and MyKayla Skinner.  The following day she was named to the team to compete at the 2019 World Championships in Stuttgart alongside Biles, Lee, Eaker, Skinner, and Grace McCallum.

During qualifications she helped the USA qualify to the team final in first place over five points ahead of second place China.  Individually she qualified to the vault final in first place ahead of Biles and recorded the second highest floor exercise score, behind Biles and tied with Lee.  However, due to Lee receiving a higher execution score, Carey did not qualify to the floor exercise final due to the rule limiting individual finals to two competitors per country.  In the team final, Carey competed on vault and floor exercise, receiving the second highest scores of the day on each, behind Biles, and helping the USA win the gold medal ahead of Russia and Italy.  During the vault final Carey performed a Cheng and an Amanar, taking a step out of bounds on the latter, earning an average score of 14.883 and winning the silver medal behind Biles and ahead of Ellie Downie of Great Britain.

In November Carey traveled to Zürich, Switzerland to compete at the Swiss Cup, a unique team competition that featured one female gymnast and one male gymnast from the same country going head-to-head with other teams.  She was partnered with Allan Bower.  Together they finished in first place, beating the Ukrainian team of Diana Varinska and Oleg Verniaiev.

2020 
In late January Carey was listed on a nominative roster that was released for the Melbourne World Cup, scheduled to take place on February 20.  She qualified in first place to both the vault and floor exercise event finals, 0.833 points ahead of Shoko Miyata and 0.633 points ahead of Vanessa Ferrari respectively.  During the vault final she competed the Cheng and double twisting Yurchenko and won gold ahead of Coline Devillard of France.  The following day she won gold on floor exercise as well, once again finishing ahead of Ferrari.

2021 
In February Carey competed at the 2021 Winter Cup where she only competed on vault, uneven bars, and balance beam.  She finished second on vault behind Jordan Chiles, sixth on uneven bars, and ninth on balance beam.  The following month at a National Team camp Carey was named to the National Team for the fourth time.  In May Carey competed at the U.S. Classic on only the uneven bars and balance beam.  She finished fifth and fifteenth respectively.

During podium training for the National Championships Carey debuted a laid out version of the Biles II (triple twisting double salto).  At the National Championships Carey finished sixth in the all-around after competing a watered-down floor exercise routine and vault.  She finished fourth on vault, eighth on uneven bars and floor exercise, and eleventh on balance beam.  As a result she was added to the national team and qualified to compete at the Olympic Trials.  At the Olympic Trials Carey competed all-around the first day of competition and only competed on uneven bars and balance beam the second day.  Days after trials had concluded Carey was officially awarded an Olympic berth via the Apparatus World Cup series.

2020 Olympics 
At the Olympic Games, Carey performed the all-around during qualifications. She hit all four routines and qualified for the vault final in second place behind Simone Biles as well as the floor exercise final in third place behind Vanessa Ferrari and Biles. 

Despite finishing ninth in the all-around, she initially did not qualify to the all-around final due to two-per-country limitations as Biles and Sunisa Lee placed higher. However, Biles later withdrew from the all-around final, and Carey, as the next-highest scoring American, took her place.  During the all-around final Carey recorded the second highest vault (behind Rebeca Andrade) and floor exercise (behind Mai Murakami and tied with Angelina Melnikova) scores; however she fell off the balance beam and finished eighth overall.

In the vault final, Carey was a heavy medal favorite but finished in last place after balking her first vault due to missteps on the runway; she had intended to perform a Cheng vault but performed only a tucked Yurchenko, a vault with a difficulty score of just 3.3. She went on to successfully perform her second vault, an Amanar with a difficulty of 5.8, but was deducted two points for performing two vaults with the same entry, finishing with an average score of 12.416, more than two full points behind the seventh finisher.  

The following day, Carey won the gold medal in the floor exercise final with a score of 14.366, outperforming her qualifications score of 14.100 and placing ahead of Italy's Vanessa Ferrari.  She is the third consecutive American champion on the event, following Aly Raisman in 2012 and Simone Biles in 2016.

Upon returning home to Arizona, Phoenix Mayor Kate Gallego proclaimed August 17 as "Jade Carey Day".  Days later it was announced that Carey would be joining Simone Biles' Gold Over America Tour.  On August 30 Carey threw the ceremonial first pitch for the Arizona Diamondbacks.

2022 
Carey made her elite return at the U.S. National Championships in August.  She placed fifth in the all-around, first on vault, second on floor exercise behind Shilese Jones, seventh on balance beam, and ninth on uneven bars.  She was named to the national team for the sixth time.  Additionally she was named USA Gymnastics Athlete of the Year.  In September Carey competed at the Paris World Challenge Cup; she only competed on vault and balance beam.  She qualified to the vault final in first and the balance beam final in second behind teammate Shilese Jones.  During event finals she won gold on vault and silver on balance beam behind Marine Boyer of France.

In October Carey was selected to compete at the 2022 World Championships alongside Skye Blakely, Jordan Chiles, Shilese Jones, and Leanne Wong.  During the qualification round Carey helped the USA qualify to the team final in first place.  Individually she qualified to the all-around, vault, and floor exercise finals.  During the team final Carey contributed scores on vault, balance beam, and floor exercise towards the USA's gold medal finish.  Additionally she posted the second highest vault and floor exercise scores of the competition behind Rebeca Andrade and Jessica Gadirova respectively.  During the all-around final Carey place sixth after a tentative balance beam routine.  On the first day of apparatus finals Carey won gold on vault, earning her first individual world title.  On the final day of competition she won bronze on floor exercise, tied with Andrade and behind Gadirova and Chiles.  With eight world and Olympic medals Carey became the sixth most decorated American female artistic gymnast of all time.

Collegiate
Carey verbally committed to compete in NCAA gymnastics at Oregon State University, starting in the 2018-19 school year. She officially signed with the Oregon State Beavers on November 9, 2017.  She deferred enrollment until after the 2020 Olympics, starting in the 2020–21 school year.  However, due to the postponement of the Olympics, Carey enrolled in classes for the 2020–21 school year but deferred competing for the Beavers until after the Olympics in 2021.

2021–2022 season 
Carey made her long awaited NCAA debut on January 15, 2022, 1528 days after she signed her national letter of intent with Oregon State University.  In the tri-meet against Washington and San Jose State Carey competed on all four apparatuses earning a 9.95 on the uneven bars and a 9.90 on the other three events, totaling a 39.650 all-around score.  She outright won the all-around, vault, uneven bars, and floor exercise titles and co-won the balance beam title alongside teammate Jenna Domingo and Skylar Killough-Wilhelm of Washington.  Additionally Carey competed various elite-level skills including the double-twisting Yurchenko on vault, the Bhardwaj on the uneven bars, and the double-twisting double salto (Silivas) on floor exercise.

Due to the new NIL rule change for NCAA athletes in the summer of 2021, Carey was eligible to profit off of her name, image, and likeness.  It was later reported that Carey had earned the biggest deal of all athletes from Oregon-based universities.

On January 23, at the second meet of the season against UCLA and UC Davis, Carey scored 9.975 on balance beam and floor exercise, 9.950 on uneven bars, and 9.90 on vault, totaling 39.800 in the all-around.  She outright won all five contested titles.  Additionally Carey's all-around score beat Oregon State gymnastics' previous all-around record of 39.750, set by Chari Knight in 1993.  As a result Carey was named both Pac-12 gymnast of the week and freshman of the week.  In her third collegiate meet and her first away meet Carey once again won the all-around with a score of 39.775, Oregon State's second highest program all-around score.  She also outright won the vault (9.95), uneven bars (9.95), and floor exercise (9.95) titles and co-won the balance beam (9.925) title with California's Emi Watterson.  Carey was subsequently named Freshman of the Week for the second time.  On February 5, in a meet against Arizona State, Carey earned her first career perfect ten on the uneven bars.  Her all-around score of 39.825 beat Oregon State's all-around program record that she had set two weeks prior.  Additionally she outright won all five contested titles and was named Pac-12 Gymnast of the Week for the second time.  On February 13 Carey earned her second career perfect 10 and first on floor exercise; she was once again named both Pac-12 gymnast and freshman of the week.  On February 25, in a meet against Stanford, Carey score another perfect ten on floor exercise.  Additionally she posted an all-around score of 39.825, tying Oregon State's program all-around record that she set earlier in the month.  Carey ended the regular season competing at a quad meet in Denver on March 13.  She posted a 9.95 on all four apparatuses and won her ninth consecutive all-around title.  She was named Pac-12 Freshman of the Week for the sixth time.

Carey was named Pac-12 gymnast of the year and freshman of the year.  At the Pac-12 Championships Carey led Oregon State to a third place finish.  Individually she won the all-around title and co-won the title on floor exercise alongside Olympic teammate Grace McCallum.  She placed second on the remaining three apparatuses.  At the NCAA regional semifinal in Seattle, Carey earned an all-around score of 39.850, beating her previous record.  Although Oregon State was eliminated after finishing third behind Utah and Stanford, Carey earned an individual all-around berth to compete at the upcoming NCAA Championship.

In early April Carey announced her decision to continue pursuing elite level gymnastics while competing NCAA gymnastics.  At the NCAA championship Carey rotated with the Oklahoma Sooners in the first semi-final.  She earned an all-around score of 39.650, the highest in the first semi-final but fourth highest overall.  Her score of 9.950 on the uneven bars was the second highest behind Trinity Thomas.

2022–2023 season 
Carey made her 2023 season debut at the Super 16 Invitational on January 6.  The following week she competed at the Wasatch Classic where she earned two perfect 10s on vault and floor exercise.  As a result she was named Pac-12 Gymnast of the Week.  The following week, in a quad-meet against Denver, Brown, and Sacramento State, Carey earned an all-around score of 39.825 to help Oregon State win the meet.  In a meet on March 4 at Arizona State University Carey earned her first perfect ten on balance beam.  In doing so she became the thirteenth gymnast to complete a gym slam, the accomplishment of scoring a perfect 10.0 on each apparatus.

Career perfect 10.0

Personal life 
Carey was born and raised in Phoenix, Arizona.  Her parents, Brian Carey and Danielle Mitchell-Greenberg, divorced when she was young.  Carey began taking gymnastics classes in 2002. She attended Mountain Ridge High School in Glendale, Arizona, graduating in 2018.

Selected competitive skills

Competitive history

Awards

References

External links
 

2000 births
Living people
American female artistic gymnasts
Sportspeople from Phoenix, Arizona
Medalists at the World Artistic Gymnastics Championships
World champion gymnasts
Oregon State Beavers women's gymnasts
People from Maricopa County, Arizona
U.S. women's national team gymnasts
Gymnasts at the 2020 Summer Olympics
Medalists at the 2020 Summer Olympics
Olympic gold medalists for the United States in gymnastics
NCAA gymnasts who have scored a perfect 10